Miletus is an unincorporated community in Doddridge County, West Virginia, United States, along Buckeye Creek.  Its post office is closed.

The origin of the name Miletus is obscure.

References 

Unincorporated communities in West Virginia
Unincorporated communities in Doddridge County, West Virginia